The 1967 All-Ireland Under-21 Hurling Championship was the fourth staging of the All-Ireland Under-21 Hurling Championship. The championship began on 14 May and ended on 3 September 1967.

Tipperary won the title after defeating Dublin by 1-8 to 1-7 in the final.

Teams

Team summaries

Results

Leinster Under-21 Hurling Championship

Munster Under-21 Hurling Championship

First round

Semi-finals

Final

Ulster Under-21 Hurling Championship

All-Ireland Under-21 Hurling Championship

External links
 1967 All-Ireland Under-21 Hurling Championship results

Under-21
All-Ireland Under-21 Hurling Championship